Hymenophyllum wilsonii, the Wilson's filmy-fern, is a small, fragile, perennial leptosporangiate fern which forms large dense colonies from creeping rhizomes.

Distribution
Confined to western Europe (Britain, Ireland, France, Norway, Spain and The Faeroes) and Macaronesia.

Gallery

References

Further reading
Page, C.N. (1997). The ferns of Britain and Ireland. 2nd Ed. Cambridge University Press. Cambridge.
Proctor, M.C.F. (2003). Comparative Ecophysiological Measurements on the Light Responses, Water Relations and Desiccation Tolerance of the Filmy Ferns Hymenophyllum wilsonii Hook. and H. tunbrigense (L.) Smith Ann Bot 91 (6).
Richards, P.W., Evans, G.B. (1972). Biological Flora of the British Isles. No. 126. Hymenophyllum tunbrigense (L.) Sm. (pp. 245–258), Hymenophyllum wilsonii Hooker (258–268). Journal of Ecology 60.

External links

Global Biodiversity Information Facility (GBIF) Data Portal: Hymenophyllum wilsonii
Online Atlas of the British and Irish Flora

wilsonii
Flora of Europe